Mikkel Duelund Poulsen (born 29 June 1997) is a Danish professional footballer who plays as a midfielder for Danish Superliga club AGF, on loan from Dynamo Kyiv.

Club career

Early career
Duelund was born in Aarhus and started playing football at the age of two in Virup IF. From the time he was two years old, until he was eight years old, he played first for Vejlby-Risskov Idrætsklub (VRI) and then for Hjortshøj-Egaa Idrætsforening (HEI). At the age of eight, he moved to IK Skovbakken, where he played for three years.

At the age of 11, Duelund joined the AGF academy; the most renowned in the city. He subsequently had offers from several other clubs, but at the age of 14 he chose to move to FC Midtjylland.

Midtjylland
Duelund began his professional career with Danish Superliga side FC Midtjylland. In 2013, he took part in a trial with Eredivisie club PSV Eindhoven but ultimately remained with Midtjylland's youth team. During his time with the U19 group, Duelund won the Top Goalscorer and Player of the Season awards as the side were crowned Danish champions. In 2014, he was named by The Guardian as one of 40 best young talents in World Football.

Following his form at youth level Duelund was promoted to the first-team, making his league debut in March 2015 against Hobro IK, coming on as a second-half substitute for Petter Andersson. By the end of his debut season he had helped the club to its first ever Superliga title. As a result of his showings in 2015 Duelund won the DBU U19 talent of the year-award.

In the year that followed he made a goalscoring debut in the Champions League against Lincoln Red Imps before later debuting in the Europa League against Napoli. In 2016–17, he became the seventh youngest player ever to score 10 career league goals in the Superliga.

In March 2018, Duelund made his 100th appearance for Midtjylland and marked the occasion with a goal in a 2–1 win over Silkeborg. The club ultimately went on to reclaim the Superliga title, ending ahead of rivals Brøndby.

Dynamo Kyiv
On 31 August 2018, Duelund signed a contract with Ukrainian club Dynamo Kyiv. He made his debut for the club on 16 September in a 1–1 away draw against Zorya Luhansk, coming on as a substitute in the 59th minute for Volodymyr Shepelyev. In his third game, he scored his first goal for the club – the game-winner in a 1–0 away win over Arsenal Kyiv.

However, he would only play sporadically. Within two months of his move, he suffered an ankle fracture which meant that he barely made any appearances for over a year and a half. After recovering in February 2020, he mostly appeared as a substitute. During the 2020–21 season, Duelund made only four league appearances, of which one was in the starting lineup. In November 2020, Duelund was one of multiple Dynamo players infected with SARS‑CoV‑2 during the COVID-19 pandemic.

NEC (loan)
On 22 June 2021, recently promoted Dutch Eredivisie club NEC Nijmegen announced that they had signed Duelund on a one-season loan from Dynamo Kyiv with an option to buy. He made his debut on 14 August in a 5–0 loss to defending champions Ajax. 

On 5 August 2022, the loan was extended by another season. He started the 2022–23 season in convincing fashion, scoring once and adding two assists on the second matchday in a 4–1 victory against FC Volendam. 

On 29 January 2023 NEC confirmed, that Duelund's contract had been terminated by mutual agreement.

AGF (loan)
Later on the same day which Duelund left NEC Nijmegen, Danish Superliga club AGF confirmed that Duelund had returned to the club, which he played for as a youth player, on a loan deal for the rest of the season.

International career
In June 2017, Duelund was one of two 19-year-olds named in Denmark's squad for the UEFA European Under-21 Championship in Poland. He featured twice at the tournament, including a start in a 3–0 loss to eventual champions Germany, before Denmark were eliminated during the group stages. He got his debut for the Denmark League XI side in a friendly against Jordan on 15 January 2018, where he scored one goal in Denmark's 2–3 loss.

Personal life
In February 2016, ahead of the Midtjylland's Europa League game against Manchester United, Duelund stated he was a lifelong fan of the Premier League club and named Wayne Rooney as his footballing idol.

Career statistics

Club

International

Scores and results list Denmark's goal tally first, score column indicates score after each Duelund goal.

Honours
Midtjylland
 Danish Superliga: 2014–15, 2017–18

Dynamo Kyiv
Ukrainian Premier League: 2020–21
Ukrainian Cup: 2019–20, 2020–21
Ukrainian Super Cup: 2019, 2020

References

External links 
 

1997 births
Living people
Danish men's footballers
Association football forwards
Danish Superliga players
Ukrainian Premier League players
Eredivisie players
VSK Aarhus players
Aarhus Gymnastikforening players
FC Midtjylland players
FC Dynamo Kyiv players
NEC Nijmegen players
Danish expatriate men's footballers
Expatriate footballers in Ukraine
Danish expatriate sportspeople in Ukraine
Expatriate footballers in the Netherlands
Danish expatriate sportspeople in the Netherlands
Footballers from Aarhus